Sacral nerve stimulation, also termed sacral neuromodulation,  is a type of medical electrical stimulation therapy.

It typically involves the implantation of a programmable stimulator subcutaneously, which delivers low amplitude electrical stimulation via a lead to the sacral nerve, usually accessed via the S3 foramen.

The U.S. Food and Drug Administration has approved InterStim Therapy, by Medtronic, as a sacral nerve stimulator for treatment of urinary incontinence, high urinary frequency and urinary retention.  Sacral nerve stimulation is also under investigation as treatment for other conditions, including constipation brought on by nerve damage due to surgical procedures. An experimental procedure for constipation in children is being conducted in Nationwide Children's Hospital.

In the event that the nerves and the brain are no longer communicating effectively, resulting in a bowel/bladder disorder, this type of treatment is designed to imitate a signal sent via the central nervous system.

One of the major nerve routes is from the brain, along the spinal cord and through the back.  This is commonly referred to as the sacral area.  This area controls the everyday function of the pelvic floor, urethral sphincter, bladder and bowel.  By stimulating the sacral nerve (located in the lower back), a signal is sent that manipulates a contraction within the pelvic floor. Over time these contractions rebuild the strength of the organs and muscles within it.  This effectively alleviates all symptoms of urinary/faecal disorders, and in many cases eliminates them completely.

Medical uses

Urge incontinence
Many studies have been initiated using the sacral nerve stimulation (SNS) technique to treat patients that suffer with urinary problems. When applying this procedure, proper patient screening is essential, because some disorders that affect the urinary tract (like bladder calculus or carcinoma in-situ) have to be treated differently. Once the patient is selected, he receives a temporary external pulse generator connected to wire leads at S3 foramina for 1–2 weeks. If the person's symptoms improve by more than 50%, he receives the permanent wire leads and stimulator that is implanted in the hip in the subcutaneous tissue. The first follow up happens 1–2 weeks later to check if the permanent devices are providing improvement in the user's symptoms and to program the pulse generator adequately.

Bleeding, infection, pain and unwanted stimulation in the extremities are some of the complications resulting from this therapy. Currently, battery replacements are necessary 5–10 years after implementation depending upon the strength of the stimulation therapy. (The newest interstim's battery can be wirelessly recharged (roughly weekly) using a paddle placed against the skin outside the implant.) This procedure has shown long term success rate that ranges from 50% to 90%, and one study concluded that it was a good option for patients with lower urinary tract dysfunction refractive to conservative and pharmacological interventions.

Fecal incontinence
Fecal incontinence, the involuntary loss of stool and flatus release afflicting mainly elderly people, can also be treated with sacral nerve stimulation as long as patients have intact sphincter muscles.  The FDA approved the approach for treating the fecal incontinence in March 2011. The etiology is not well understood yet and both conservative treatments (like antidiarrheics, special diet and biofeedback) and surgical treatments for this disorder are not regarded as ideal options.

Pascual et al. (2011) revised the follow up results of the first 50 people that submit to sacral nerve stimulation (SNS) to treat fecal incontinence in Madri (Spain). The most common cause for the fecal incontinence was obstetric procedures, idiopathic origin and prior anal surgery, and all these people were refractory to the conservative treatment. The procedure consisted of placing a temporary pulse generator connected to a unilateral electrode at S3 or S4 foramen for 2–4 weeks. After it was confirmed that the SNS was decreasing the incontinence episodes, the patients received the definitive electrode and pulse generator that was implanted in the gluteus or in the abdomen.  Two patients did not show improvement in the first step and did not receive the definitive stimulator. Mean follow up was 17.02 months and during this time the patients showed improvement in the voluntary contraction pressure and reduction of incontinence episodes. Complications were two cases of infection, two cases with pain and one broken electrode. Therefore, although the reason the SNS is effective is unknown, this procedure had satisfactory results in these clinical cases with a low incidence of complications, and the study concluded that it was a good option for treatment of anal incontinence.

Limited evidence from a Cochrane review of randomised controlled trials suggests that sacral nerve stimulation may help to reduce fecal incontinence.

Method
TENS (transcutaneous electrical nerve stimulation) was patented and first used in 1974 for pain relief.  TENS is non-invasive; it sends electric current through electrodes placed directly on the skin.  Although predominantly carried out as a percutaneous procedure, it is possible to apply sacral nerve stimulation with the use of these external electrodes. It is not known if TENS helps with chronic pain in people with fibromyalgia or neuropathic pain. There are currently no studies into the efficacy of this on an overactive bladder and other associated symptoms of urinary incontinence, however, in a report carried out by GUT (an international peer-reviewed journal for health professionals and researchers in gastroenterology and hepatology) it was found that 20% of the group tested achieved complete continence.  All others saw a significant reduction in the frequency of FI episodes and an improvement in the ability to defer defecation.

The first percutaneous sacral nerve stimulation study was performed in 1988.  By penetrating the skin, sacral nerve stimulation aims to give a direct and localized electric current to specific nerves in order to elicit a favored response.  Today it is one of the most common neuromodulation techniques.

Percutaneous procedure

Patients interested in getting a sacral nerve stimulator implanted in them because less severe methods have failed all must go through a trial for their own safety, known as the PNE (percutaneous nerve evaluation).  PNE involves inserting a temporary electrode to the left or right of the S3 posterior foramen.  This electrode is connected to an external pulse generator, which generates a signal for 3–5 days.  If this neuromodulation has positive results for the patient, the option of implanting a permanent electrode for permanent sacral neuromodulation is possible.

The procedure has low level of invasiveness, as all incisions are relatively small.  A pulse generator is implanted in a subcutaneous pocket in the upper, outer quadrant of the buttock or even the lower abdomen. The generator is attached to a thin lead wire with a small electrode tip which is anchored near the sacral nerve.

The most common postoperative complaints are pain and lead migration.  In most studies, usually 5-10% of subjects need post-operative correction to lead migration, but since leads can be anchored near the sacral nerve, subsequent operations are generally unnecessary.

Mechanism

Stimulation of the sacral nerve causes contraction of external sphincter and pelvic floor muscle, which in turn causes the inhibition of bladder contractions which may be involuntarily releasing urine. Researchers currently believe that the sacral neuromodulation blocks the c-afferent fibers, which are a critical part of the afferent limb of a pathological reflex arc believed to be responsible for incontinence.

See also
 Urinary incontinence
 Fecal incontinence
 Transcutaneous electrical nerve stimulation (TENS)
 Electrical muscle stimulation

References

Bibliography

External links
 Fecal Incontinence

Neurotechnology